The 1965 All-Ireland Senior Hurling Championship was the 79th staging of the All-Ireland hurling championship since its establishment by the Gaelic Athletic Association in 1887. The championship began on 25 April 1965 and ended on 5 September 1965.

Tipperary were the defending champions, and retained their All-Ireland crown following a 2-16 to 0-10 defeat of Wexford. It was the team's fourth All-Ireland championship in five years.

Teams

A total of thirteen teams contested the championship, the same number and makeup of participants from the previous championship.

Team summaries

Results

Leinster Senior Hurling Championship

First round

Quarter-final

Semi-finals

Final

Munster Senior Hurling Championship

Quarter-finals

Semi-finals

Final

All-Ireland Senior Hurling Championship

Final

Championship statistics

Scoring

Top scorers overall

Top scorers in a single game

Sources

 Corry, Eoghan, The GAA Book of Lists (Hodder Headline Ireland, 2005).
 Donegan, Des, The Complete Handbook of Gaelic Games (DBA Publications Limited, 2005).
 Sweeney, Éamonn, Munster Hurling Legends (The O'Brien Press, 2002).

External links
 1965 All-Ireland Senior Hurling Championship results

1965